"We Are Here" is a song by American recording artist Alicia Keys. It was written and produced by Keys, Swizz Beatz, Mark Batson, and Harold Lilly. The song debuted on Keys' Facebook page on September 8, 2014, accompanied by a text post explaining Keys' motivations and inspirations for the song. An up-tempo ballad, "We Are Here" describes Keys' frustration with both national and international issues, including the conflict between Israel and Gaza and the outbreak of the Ebola virus, as well as problems with education and gun laws in the United States. It was released digitally a week later and Keys performed the song on Today on September 15.

Following the song's release, Keys launched a movement, called the We Are Here Movement, calling for a more equal and just world. Some social issues that the movement promotes is ending poverty and oppression, rights for women and children, and environmental activism. On the site of the cause, people can read about and donate to 12 different groups, striving towards, among other things, improving gay rights, fighting racial inequity in the American justice system, and also her own organization, Keep a Child Alive. Keys donated $1 million of her own money divided equally amongst the 12 groups.

"We Are Here" was featured in the short film We Rise; that film was part of the New-York Historical Society's "Hotbed" exhibit about women's suffrage, which ran from November 3, 2017, to March 25, 2018.

Critical reception
"We Are Here" was nominated for "Best Song with a Message" award at the 2014 MTV Europe Music Awards. Billboard rated the song two stars out of five and gave the song a negative review. The review stated that an attempt "to effect social change through song would hit if it weren't such an overwrought exercise in cliche. The midtempo cut attempts to unify, but its earnestness is embarrassing".

Music video
The music video of "We Are Here" premiered on Facebook on September 8, 2014, and was uploaded to YouTube on September 15, where it has since been viewed close to 8 million times. The video, which was directed by Art Johnson, is set on top of a skyscraper in New York City, with Keys playing the piano and singing. On the piano, the words "freedom" and "peace" are written multiple times. The video ends with the words "War is over if you want it".

Live performances
"We Are Here" was performed on Today on September 15, 2014. During the performance, Keys was sitting behind a piano that read "Love". Rap-Up commented that Keys "belted out the inspiring anthem". Vibe wrote that Keys "let her voice scale high over the song". Robbie Daw of Idolator said that Keys delivered a "touching performance" of the song.

Keys sang "We Are Here" on the Elvis Duran and the Morning Show on September 17, 2014. Keys made a surprise appearance at the iHeartRadio Music Festival in Las Vegas on September 19, 2014 and performed "We Are Here". During the performance, pictures of people and their #WeAreHere messages were shown. On September 27, 2014 she performed the song together with Amir-Kanoon and Idan Raichel onstage at the 2014 Global Citizen Festival in Central Park in New York City. On September 29, 2014, Keys appeared on The View and performed "We Are Here". Keys performed "We Are Here" along with "Empire State of Mind" and "No One" at the 2014 We Can Survive Concert held at the Hollywood Bowl in Los Angeles on October 24, 2014. During an interview for Yahoo! Style, Keys performed a snippet of the song for Joe Zee. Keys will perform "We Are Here" live at the 2014 MTV Europe Music Awards.

Track listing

Charts

References

2014 singles
Alicia Keys songs
Contemporary R&B ballads
Soul ballads
RCA Records singles
2014 songs
Songs written by Alicia Keys
Songs written by Swizz Beatz
Songs written by Harold Lilly (songwriter)
Songs written by Mark Batson
Song recordings produced by Swizz Beatz